Bang for the Buck is a studio album by Long Beach hip hop group Ugly Duckling. "Smack" was featured in Tony Hawk's Project 8.

Track listing
"Bang for the Buck" - 3:08
"Yudee!" - 3:56
"The Breakdown" - 3:28
"Left Behind" - 3:33
"Smack" - 3:56
"Einstein's on Stage" - 3:18
"Let it Out" - 3:36
"Lower the Boom" - 3:46
"Andy vs. Dizzy" - 2:20
"Slow the Flow" - 4:04
"Shoot Your Shot (Ft. People Under The Stairs)" - 4:22
"The End of Time" - 4:17
"Soul for Sale" - 3:23

Samples

"The Breakdown" samples "Organ Mania," by Alan Hawkshaw.

References

2006 albums
Ugly Duckling (hip hop group) albums
Fat Beats Records albums